Lower Prince's Quarter is a town in Sint Maarten, in the Kingdom of the Netherlands. It has a population of 8,143 making it the largest settlement on the island of Saint Martin.

See also
 List of Designated Monuments in Lower Prince's Quarter

References

Populated places in Sint Maarten